The 2019–20 Pro Basketball League, for sponsorship reasons the EuroMillions Basketball League, season was the 93rd season of the Pro Basketball League (PBL), first tier of basketball in Belgium. The season started on 13 September 2019 and was stopped abruptly in March 2020 due to the COVID-19 pandemic. On 13 March 2020, the Belgian Basketball Association decided, in agreement with all participating clubs, to end the season rather than assume the postponed matches could still be played, taking the current standings as final. As such, Oostende won their 21st title.

Format
For the regular season, teams will be divided into two five-team groups according to their positions in the previous season. Teams qualified in positions 1, 3, 5, 7 and 9 joined the Group A while the rest will compose the Group B.

Firstly, all teams will face each other of their group once home and away while in a second round, every PBL team will play each other home and away.

Teams
The same tean teams from the previous season joined the competition.

Arenas and locations

Personnel and jerseys

Regular season

First round

Group A

Group B

Second round

Results

Play-offs
Quarterfinals and semifinals were scheduled to be played in a best-of-three games format, while the finals would be held in a best-of-five (1-1-1-1-1) format. However due to the COVID-19 pandemic these were not held at all.

Individual awards

MVP of the Week

In European competitions

Notes

References

External links
Official website

Basketball League Belgium Division I seasons
Belgian
Lea